Devaud is a French surname. Notable people with the surname include:

Marcelle Devaud (1908–2008), French politician
Stanislas Devaud (1896–1963), French politician

French-language surnames